Frank Alan Hamblen II (April 16, 1947 – September 30, 2017) was an American basketball coach and scout. He played college basketball at Syracuse. He died in San Diego on September 30, 2017.

Early life
Born in Terre Haute, Indiana in 1947, Hamblen graduated from Garfield High School in Terre Haute in 1965. As a Sophomore, he was a reserve guard on the 1963 IHSAA State Finals team that was defeated by South Bend Central, 72–45 in the first game of the semi-final round. He finished as the Purple Eagles' #3 scorer behind 3-time All-American Terry Dischinger and Hall of Famer Clyde Lovellette. Hamblen was recognized among the top 12 high school basketball players in Indiana and 25 years later was named to the Silver Anniversary Team in 1990 by the Indiana Sports Hall of Fame.

College career
Hamblen graduated from Syracuse University in 1969. On the Syracuse Orange men's basketball team, Hamblen earned three letters and was team captain as a senior. Hamblen averaged 4.6 points per game as a senior.

Coaching career
Hamblen served as an interim head coach for two different teams – the Milwaukee Bucks in 1991–1992 and the Los Angeles Lakers in 2005. He also has served as an assistant coach on six NBA teams (Kansas City/Sacramento Kings, Milwaukee Bucks, Chicago Bulls, Los Angeles Lakers), often alongside Phil Jackson. Hamblen has been an assistant coach on seven championship teams, two with Jackson's Bulls and five with Jackson's Lakers. Jackson retired after the 2010–11 season, and Hamblen's contract with the Lakers expired as well.

Head coaching record

|-
| align="left" |Milwaukee
| align="left" |
| 65 || 23 || 42 ||  || align="center"|6th in Central ||—||—||—||—
| align="center" |Missed playoffs
|-
| align="left" |L.A. Lakers
| align="left" |
| 39 || 10 || 29 ||  || align="center"|4th in Pacific ||—||—||—||—
| align="center" |Missed playoffs
|-class="sortbottom"
! colspan="2"| Career
! 104 || 33 || 71 ||  || || — || — || — || — ||

References

External links
 NBA.com coach profile
 BasketballReference: Frank Hamblen
 OrangeHoops: Frank Hamblen

1947 births
2017 deaths
American men's basketball coaches
American men's basketball players
Basketball coaches from Indiana
Basketball players from Indiana
Chicago Bulls assistant coaches
Los Angeles Lakers assistant coaches
Los Angeles Lakers head coaches
Milwaukee Bucks head coaches
Sportspeople from Terre Haute, Indiana
Syracuse Orange men's basketball players